"For Goodness Sakes, Look at Those Cakes" is a song written and performed by James Brown. Released as an edited two-part single in 1978, it charted #52 R&B in 1979. A full-length version appears on the album Take a Look at Those Cakes. Brown talks loudly and clearly in rhyme without only brief singing involved, this track being in part a precursor to the hip hop style which was yet to mount on record in a few years time. Robert Christgau described the song as "a great throwaway--an eleven-minute rumination on ass-watching, including genuinely tasteless suggestions that Ray Charles and Stevie Wonder join the fun."

References

James Brown songs
Songs written by James Brown
1978 singles
1978 songs
Polydor Records singles